Kollam or Quilon is one of the oldest port cities in India. It is also an ancient civilization in the country. Kollam city is home to a population of more than 3.5 Lakh (350,000) people. The city has population density of 6199/km2, which is the second highest in Kerala next to Kollam Metropolitan Area with a total population of 11.10 Lakh.

Kollam's healthcare sector is considered one of the most developed in the state of Kerala. There were hospitals giving free Modern medical treatment (Dharmasupathris) in Quilon since ME 995. The Metropolitan Area of Kollam has 3 Medical Colleges and a good number of multi-speciality and super-speciality hospitals. At present, the healthcare industry is witnessing stiff competition among these hospitals.

Medical College Hospitals
 Government Medical College Hospital, Kollam
 Azeezia Medical College Hospital, Meeyannoor
 Travancore Medical College Hospital, Mevaram

Multi-specialty/Super-specialty Hospitals
 Meditrina Hospital, Ayathil
 N. S. Memorial Institute of Medical Sciences, Palathara
 ESIC Model & Super Speciality Hospital, Asramam
 ESIC Hospital, Ezhukone
 Padmavathy Medical Foundation, Sasthamkotta 
 Holy Cross Super Speciality Hospital, Kottiyam
 Dr. Nairs Hospital, Asramam
 Shankar's Institute Of Medical Science (SIMS), Kadappakada
 Upasana Hospital, Chinnakada
 Bishop Benziger Hospital, Beach Road
 Ashtamudi Hospital & Trauma Care Centre, Mevaram
 Kerala Institute of Medical Sciences (KIMS), Kottiyam
 Valiyath Institute of Medical Sciences, Karunagappally
Parabrahma Hospital and Research Centre, Oachira 
EMS Co-Operative Hospital, Pathanapuram
Sree Sathya Sai Super Speciality Hospital, Kottarakkara
Vijaya Hospital, Kottarakkara
Poyanil Hospital, Punalur  
 Matha Medical Centre, Kadavoor, Kollam

BR Hospital & Research Centre, Nedungolam

Other Government Hospitals
 Government District Hospital, Downtown
 Government Victoria Hospital(for Women & Children), Downtown
 District TB Centre, Chinnakada
 Government Taluk Hospital, Neendakara
 Government TB Centre, Karunagappally
 Government Taluk Headquarters Hospital, Karunagappally
 Ramarao Memorial Government Taluk Hospital, Nedungolam, Paravur
 Government Taluk Hospital, Kundara
 Government Taluk Headquarters Hospital, Kottarakkara
Govt Taluk Headquarters Hospital, Punalur 
 Government Taluk Headquarters Hospital, Sasthamkotta

Private Hospitals
 Kumar Hospital, High School Jn.
 P.N.N Memorial Hospital, Anchalumoodu
 C. Achutha Menon Co-Operative Hospital, Palathara
 Kerala ENT Research Foundation, Thevally
 Amardeep Eye Hospital, Kilikollur 
 Mar Theodosius Memorial Medical Mission Hospital, Sasthamcotta
 K. Damodaran Memorial Hospital, Chinnakada
 PMR Hospital, Valathungal
 Prathiba Hospital, Tangasseri
 Christ Church Hospital, Pallithottam
 Chaithanya Eye Hospital, Pallimukku
 C.Achutha Menon Co-operative Hospital, Decent Jn.
 Devans Hospital, Keralapuram
 SSR Hospital, Keralapuram
 London Missionary Society Boys' Brigade Hospital (LMS), Kundara
 Assisi Atonement Hospital, Kottamkara
 Lekshmi Trust Hospital, Kundara
 Star Hospital, Oachira  
Pranavam Hospital, Punalur 
St Thomas Hospital, Punalur 
 A.M Hospital, Karunagappally
 Pearl Hospital, Karunagappally
 S.B.M Hospital, Karunagappally
 Ideal Clinic, Karunagappally
 Royal Hospital, Chathannoor
 MKM Hospital, Kuttivattom
 Paravur Hospital, Paravur
 Captain Mathews Hospital, Mulavana
 Christhuraj Hospital, Kottarakara
 Lotus Heart Hospital, Kottarakara
 MGM Hospital, Puthoor
Thettikkuzhy Hospital, Kunnikodu
 St Joseph Hospital, Anchal
Dr K Damodaran Memorial Hospital, Kollam 
 The Lifeline Fertility and Well Woman Centre, Prathibha Jn, Kadappakkada

References

External links

Kollam
Hospitals
Kollam